The material conditional (also known as material implication) is an operation commonly used in logic. Material implication can also be characterized inferentially by modus ponens, modus tollens, conditional proof, and classical reductio ad absurdum.

Material implication is used in all the basic systems of classical logic as well as some nonclassical logics. It is assumed as a model of correct conditional reasoning within mathematics and serves as the basis for commands in many programming languages. However, many logics replace material implication with other operators such as the strict conditional and the variably strict conditional. Due to the paradoxes of material implication and related problems, material implication is not generally considered a viable analysis of conditional sentences in natural language.

Notation 
In logic and related fields, the material conditional is customarily notated with an infix operator →. The material conditional is also notated using the infixes ⊃ and ⇒. In the prefixed Polish notation, conditionals are notated as Cpq. In a conditional formula p → q, the subformula p is referred to as the antecedent and q is termed the consequent of the conditional. Conditional statements may be nested such that the antecedent or the consequent may themselves be conditional statements, as in the formula .

History 
In Arithmetices Principia: Nova Methodo Exposita (1889), Peano expressed the proposition “If A then B” as “A Ɔ B” with the symbol Ɔ, which is the opposite of C. He also expressed the proposition “A ⊂ B” as “A Ɔ B”. Russell followed Peano in his Principia Mathematica (1910–1913), in which he expressed the proposition “If A then B” as “A ⊃ B”. Following Russell, Gentzen expressed the proposition “If A then B” as “A ⊃ B”. Heyting expressed the proposition “If A then B” as “A ⊃ B” at first but later came to express it as “A → B” with a right-pointing arrow.

Definitions

Semantics
From a semantic perspective, material implication is the binary truth functional operator which returns "true" unless its first argument is true and its second argument is false. This semantics can be shown graphically in a truth table such as the one below.

Truth table
The truth table of p → q:

Deductive definition
Material implication can also be characterized deductively in terms of the following rules of inference.

 Modus ponens
 Conditional proof
 Classical contraposition
 Classical reductio ad absurdum

Unlike the semantic definition, this approach to logical connectives permits the examination of structurally identical propositional forms in various logical systems, where somewhat different properties may be demonstrated. For example, in intuitionistic logic, which rejects proofs by contraposition as valid rules of inference,  is not a propositional theorem, but the material conditional is used to define negation.

Formal properties

When disjunction, conjunction and negation are classical, material implication validates the following equivalences:
 Contraposition: 
 Import-Export: 
 Negated conditionals: 
 Or-and-if: 
 Commutativity of antecedents: 
 Distributivity: 

Similarly, on classical interpretations of the other connectives, material implication validates the following entailments:
 Antecedent strengthening: 
 Vacuous conditional:  
 Transitivity: 
 Simplification of disjunctive antecedents: 

Tautologies involving material implication include:
 Reflexivity: 
 Totality: 
 Conditional excluded middle:

Discrepancies with natural language 

Material implication does not closely match the usage of conditional sentences in natural language. For example, even though material conditionals with false antecedents are vacuously true, the natural language statement "If 8 is odd, then 3 is prime" is typically judged false. Similarly, any material conditional with a true consequent is itself true, but speakers typically reject sentences such as "If I have a penny in my pocket, then Paris is in France". These classic problems have been called the paradoxes of material implication. In addition to the paradoxes, a variety of other arguments have been given against a material implication analysis. For instance, counterfactual conditionals would all be vacuously true on such an account.

In the mid-20th century, a number of researchers including H. P. Grice and Frank Jackson proposed that pragmatic principles could explain the discrepancies between natural language conditionals and the material conditional. On their accounts, conditionals denote material implication but end up conveying additional information when they interact with conversational norms such as Grice's maxims. Recent work in formal semantics and philosophy of language has generally eschewed material implication as an analysis for natural-language conditionals. In particular, such work has often rejected the assumption that natural-language conditionals are truth functional in the sense that the truth value of "If P, then Q" is determined solely by the truth values of P and Q. Thus semantic analyses of conditionals typically propose alternative interpretations built on foundations such as modal logic, relevance logic, probability theory, and causal models.

Similar discrepancies have been observed by psychologists studying conditional reasoning. For instance, the notorious Wason selection task study, less than 10% of participants reasoned according to the material conditional. Some researchers have interpreted this result as a failure of the participants to confirm to normative laws of reasoning, while others interpret the participants as reasoning normatively according to nonclassical laws.

See also

 Boolean domain
 Boolean function
 Boolean logic
 Conditional quantifier
 Implicational propositional calculus
 Laws of Form
 Logical graph
 Logical equivalence
 Material implication (rule of inference)
 Peirce's law
 Propositional calculus
 Sole sufficient operator

Conditionals
 Counterfactual conditional
 Indicative conditional
 Corresponding conditional
 Strict conditional

Notes

References

Further reading 
 Brown, Frank Markham (2003), Boolean Reasoning:  The Logic of Boolean Equations, 1st edition, Kluwer Academic Publishers, Norwell, MA.  2nd edition, Dover Publications, Mineola, NY, 2003.
 Edgington, Dorothy (2001), "Conditionals", in Lou Goble (ed.), The Blackwell Guide to Philosophical Logic, Blackwell.
 Quine, W.V. (1982), Methods of Logic, (1st ed. 1950), (2nd ed. 1959), (3rd ed. 1972), 4th edition, Harvard University Press, Cambridge, MA.
 Stalnaker, Robert, "Indicative Conditionals", Philosophia, 5 (1975): 269–286.

External links

Logical connectives
Conditionals
Logical consequence
Semantics